Hraň is a village and municipality in the Trebišov District in the Košice Region of south-eastern Slovakia.

History
In historical records the village was first mentioned in 1360.

Geography
The village lies at an altitude of 111 metres and covers an area of 17.401 km².
It has a population of about 1570 people.

Ethnicity
The village is about 95% Slovak.

Facilities
The village has a public library, a gym and a football pitch.

Genealogical resources

The records for genealogical research are available at the state archive "Statny Archiv in Kosice, Slovakia"

 Roman Catholic church records (births/marriages/deaths): 1755-1917 (parish B)
 Greek Catholic church records (births/marriages/deaths): 1773-1937 (parish B)
 Reformated church records (births/marriages/deaths): 1768-1907 (parish B)

See also
 List of municipalities and towns in Slovakia

External links
https://web.archive.org/web/20070513023228/http://www.statistics.sk/mosmis/eng/run.html
Surnames of living people in Hran

Villages and municipalities in Trebišov District
Zemplín (region)